Ghanima Atreides is a fictional character from the Dune universe created by Frank Herbert. Born at the end of Dune Messiah (1969), Ghanima is a central character in Children of Dune (1976). She also appears as a child in the Brian Herbert/Kevin J. Anderson prequel The Winds of Dune (2009). In Herbert's works, the name Ghanima means "spoil of war" in the Fremen language.

Ghanima is portrayed by Jessica Brooks in the 2003 miniseries Frank Herbert's Children of Dune.

Dune Messiah and Children of Dune
She is the daughter of Paul Atreides and his Fremen concubine Chani, and the twin sister to Leto II Atreides. Like her aunt Alia and her brother Leto, Ghanima is pre-born; Chani had consumed so much melange during her pregnancy that Leto and Ghanima had awakened to full, adult consciousness before birth, receiving the genetic memories of both their male and female ancestors.

In the Bene Gesserit ritual known as the spice agony, an acolyte ingests an "illuminating poison" called the Water of Life which, if the initiate survives the ordeal, unlocks these Other Memories. These ego-personalities reside in the background of consciousness, but may be accessed to provide unique knowledge and insight. However, the memories unleashed in this ritual are always of female ancestors; access to the male line is unique to the pre-born, and theoretically to a specially-bred male known as the Kwisatz Haderach.

The equally unique danger is that, because an unborn child has not yet developed a strong personal identity, the in utero exposure to Other Memory makes that individual highly susceptible to becoming possessed by the personality of one of their ancestors. Called an Abomination by the Bene Gesserit, a child born this way is always killed whenever possible. Unlike Alia, Ghanima never succumbs to Abomination; her mind is ultimately guarded from possession by the memories of her mother Chani.

Ghanima has a very close relationship with Leto; they work together to create the Golden Path, a plan to avoid humanity's almost inevitable future destruction. She supplies her fertile creativity to the details of the plan, and even ensures its success by performing a ritual to make herself believe that Leto is killed by Laza tigers, when in reality Leto is searching the desert for Jacurutu. Her memories are restored when Leto speaks to her the key words, "Secher Nbiw", i.e. "The Golden Path" translated into Middle Egyptian.

Alia tries to use Ghanima as bait for House Corrino by promising her hand in marriage to the Corrino heir, Farad'n, which Ghanima initially resists. She relents after swearing to kill him on their wedding night.

Upon Leto's ascension to the Lion Throne, he weds Ghanima in a purely symbolic marriage. Ghanima agrees to take Farad'n as her mate, and Leto appoints Farad'n to the post of Royal Scribe. As Leto's joining with the sandworm effectively renders him sterile, Ghanima and Farad'n would thus ensure the continuation of the Atreides line.

In God Emperor of Dune, the Duncan Idaho ghola notes that "the Tleilaxu history said Ghanima had died after a relatively normal life."

Origin of the name 
In the original novel Dune, a young Alia refers to Paul's servant Harah as "My brother's ghanima." According to Fremen custom, Paul had acquired Harah after defeating her husband Jamis in a ritual battle to the death. The Lady Jessica notes:

In Dune Messiah, Harah objects when Paul chooses to name his daughter Ghanima, saying that it is "an ill-omened name." Paul responds, "It saved your life ... What matter that Alia made fun of you with that name? My daughter is Ghanima, a spoil of war."

In adaptations
Ghanima is portrayed by Jessica Brooks in the 2003 miniseries Frank Herbert's Children of Dune. Laura Fries of Variety wrote, "the mini picks up a great deal of charisma when [James] McAvoy [as Leto] and Brooks come aboard as the next generation of the house of Atreides." The characters Leto and Ghanima were aged from ten-year-olds to teens for the miniseries, which Emmet Asher-Perrin of Tor.com called "a smart move here, as finding two ten year old kids who had the ability to behave as though they had millennia of ancestral memory bubbling up inside of them was always going to be an impossibility." Asher-Perrin also called the rapport between Brooks and McAvoy "dazzling".

Family tree

References

Dune (franchise) characters
Fictional emperors and empresses
Fictional twins
Literary characters introduced in 1969